Grasshopper Takeover (also known as GTO) were a band from Omaha, Nebraska, United States. They were formed in December 1995. Its members were Bob Boyce (Vocals, Drums), Curtis Grubb (Vocals, Guitar), James McMann (Bass), and  they were later joined by Michael Cioffero (Guitar). They released five full-length CDs and three EPs. Their last EPs "Hear No Evil" and "See No Evil" were part of a three disc collection that was never completed.

Prior to Grasshopper Takeover, Grubb and Boyce were both in a band called Kind.

Since Grasshopper Takeover, Boyce and McMann have worked with their band, "Two Drag Club," performing primarily in the Omaha Area.  Grubb owns a recording studio, and Cioffero went on to pursue a doctorate in classical guitar.

In August 2003, GTO played at the Paris Las Vegas for VH1's Summers End Concert. Having qualified for the event via a national online competition, sponsored by Budweiser, GTO played in a showcase with several other bands. The show was headlined by The Donnas and the Goo Goo Dolls.

Members
Curtis Grubb - vocals, guitar (1995-)
Bob Boyce - drums, vocals (1995-)
James McMann - bass (1995-)
Ben Zinn - guitar (2005-present)

Former members
Tyler Owen - guitar
Michael Cioffero - guitar (2003-2005)

Discography
CDs:

Grasshopper Takeover - 1997
Gaia - 1998
International Dance Marathon - 2000
The Green Album - 2001
Elephant Dreams - 2003

EPs

Echo Park - 1999
Hear No Evil - 2003
See No Evil - 2005
Speak No Evil - N/R

External links 
The Official Grasshopper Takeover Website (no longer maintained)

Rock music groups from Nebraska
Musical groups from Omaha, Nebraska